Giuseppe Trivellini (26 September 1895 – 28 April 1977) was an Italian footballer who played as a goalkeeper. One of the first one-club men in Italy, he played for Brescia throughout his entire career.

He represented Italy seven times, the first being on 31 January 1915, the occasion of a friendly match against Switzerland in a 3–1 home win.

References

1895 births
1977 deaths
Italian footballers
Italy international footballers
Association football goalkeepers
Brescia Calcio players